Frederick Leister (1 December 1885 – 24 August 1970), was an English actor. He began his career in musical comedy and after serving in the First World War he played character roles in modern West End plays and in classic drama. He appeared in more than 60 films between 1922 and 1961.

Life and career
Leister was born in London, the son of George Leister Holloway and his wife Mary Ann King Holloway, née Le Capelain. He was educated at Dulwich and Worthing Grammar School. He was intended for a career as a lawyer and served his time as an articled clerk to a solicitor's firm. He made his stage debut at the Crown Theatre, Peckham, in 1906 in the chorus of A Country Girl and spent the next six years touring in musical comedies. He made his London debut at the Prince's Theatre in February 1913 and appeared in supporting roles at the Lyceum and the Duke of York's until 1915, when he joined the army. He served as a lieutenant in the Royal Garrison Artillery, entering France in September 1917. In 1911, he married Dora Luther. Thesy had one daughter together, Jean. In 1929, he and Dora changed their name to Leister, by deed poll. Dora died in 1954, aged 64.

For the rest of his acting career Leister divided his time between the classics and lighter pieces such as detective plays and drawing room comedy, with occasional excursions into musical comedy. His classic roles included Falstaff in The Merry Wives of Windsor (1919), Faulconbridge in King John (1920), Pavel Lebedyev in Ivanov (1950) and Peter Nikolayavich in The Seagull (1953). He played the Emperor in The White Horse Inn at the London Coliseum in 1931. In modern plays two of his longest-running engagements were as Maxwell Davenport in The Late Christopher Bean (1933–34) and as Charles Donkin, the central figure in Ian Hay's comedy Housemaster (1936–37). He appeared on Broadway in the same role in 1938, when the play was retitled Bachelor Born. In 1944 he featured in the West End hit play No Medals by Esther McCracken.

Filmography

The Glorious Adventure (1922) as A Knight/Courtier (film debut) (uncredited)
The Message (1930, Short) as Inspector Hudson
Bracelets (1931) as Slim Symes
Dreyfus (1931) as Edgar Demange
Down River (1931) as Inspector Manning
The World, the Flesh, the Devil (1932) as Sir James Hall
Evensong (1934) as Emperor Franz Josef
The Iron Duke (1934) as King of Prussia
Whom the Gods Love (1936) as Emperor
O.H.M.S. (1937) as Vice Consul
The Show Goes On (1937) as O.B. Dalton
King Solomon's Mines (1937) as Diamond Buyer (uncredited)
Dinner at the Ritz (1937) as Tarade
Sixty Glorious Years (1938) as H. H. Asquith
The Outsider (1939) as Joseph Sturdee
Goodbye, Mr. Chips (1939) as Marsham
On the Night of the Fire (1939) as Inspector
The Prime Minister (1941) as Lord Melbourne
Spellbound (1941) as Mr. Vincent
Atlantic Ferry (1941) as James Morison
The Next of Kin (1942) as Colonel
The Young Mr. Pitt (1942) as Lord Auckland (uncredited)
We'll Meet Again (1943) as Mr. Hatropp
The Gentle Sex (1943) as Colonel Lawrence
Dear Octopus (1943) as Charles Randolph
The Shipbuilders (1943) as Mr. Villier
The Hundred Pound Window (1944) as Ernest Draper
One Exciting Night (1944) as Hampton
Kiss the Bride Goodbye (1945) as Captain Blood
The Agitator (1945) as Mark Overend
The Captive Heart (1946) as Mr. Mowbray
So Well Remembered (1947) as John Channing
Mrs. Fitzherbert (1947) as Henry Errington
Night Beat (1947) as Magistrate
Escape (1948) as Judge
Quartet (1948) as Prison Governor (segment "The Kite")
Forbidden (1949) as Dr. Franklin
All Over the Town (1949) as Wainer
For Them That Trespass (1949) as The Vicar
Paper Orchid (1949) as Walter Wibberley
Dear Mr. Prohack (1949) as The Director General
Landfall (1949) as Admiral
Boys in Brown (1949) as Judge
The Twenty Questions Murder Mystery (1950) as Police Commissioner
The Astonished Heart (1950) as Vicar in Play (voice, uncredited)
The Rossiter Case (1951) as Sir James Ferguson
Green Grow the Rushes (1951) as Col. Gill
The Crimson Pirate (1952) as Sebastian
Circumstantial Evidence (1952) as Sir Edward Carteret
Top Secret (1952) as Prime Minister
Souls in Conflict (1954) as Rev. Alan Woodbridge
Delayed Action (1954) as Sir Francis (uncredited)
Before I Wake (1955) as Dr. Elder
The End of the Affair (1955) as Dr. Collingwood
The Dam Busters (1955) as Committee Member
Footsteps in the Fog (1955) as Dr. Simpson
The Time of His Life (1955) as Sir John Carter-Wilson
Around the World in 80 Days (1956) as Reform Club Member (uncredited)
Dangerous Exile (1957) as Capt. Andrew Ogden
Rx Murder (1958) as Dr. Alexander
Left Right and Centre (1959) as Dr. Rushall
Cone of Silence (1960) as Sir Henry (uncredited)
Surprise Package (1960) as Aide to King Pavel II (uncredited)
The Naked Edge (1961) as Judge (final film)

Notes

References

External links

Frederick Leister at Theatricalia.com

1885 births
1970 deaths
20th-century English male actors
Male actors from London
English male stage actors
English male film actors
English male television actors
British Army personnel of World War I
Royal Garrison Artillery officers